The State Committee for Transport and Roads is a Cabinet department in the Executive branch of the Republic of Bashkortostan  government. It is the successor of the former Ministry of Construction, architecture and transport, which was split in State Committee for construction and architecture and State Committee for Transport and Roads in 2010 under President Rustem Khamitov.

Mission
The Republic of Bashkortostan State Committee of Transport and Roads is working to strengthen the Transport and Roads market to bolster the economy and protect consumers;

State Committee of the Republic of Bashkortostan for Transport and Road Facilities 

State Committee of the Republic of Bashkortostan for Transport and Road Facilities executes cross-sector coordination and functional regulation in the sphere of road facilities and organization of passenger transportation via motor, railway, inland water, air suburban and inter-municipal transport in the Republic of Bashkortostan.
Among the main tasks of the State Committee there is:
 coordination of the development of the Republic transportation infrastructure, organization of optimal interaction of different transport types to satisfy consumer demand and demands of the Republic of Bashkortostan for transportation services to the maximum, reduction of transportation expenses;
coordination of cargo services rendered by transportation companies in the Republic of Bashkortostan except pipeline and industrial railway transportation;
planning and performance of road activities in relation to public (general-purpose) motor roads of the Republic, of regional and inter-municipal significance, implementation of measures to ensure safe-keeping and integrity of the motor roads;
coordination of work in the field of pricing and pricing policy in transportation.
The State Committee performs the following main functions:
organization of transportation services to the consumer by means of motor, railway, inland water, air suburban and inter-municipal transport in the Republic of Bashkortostan;
organization of work to form the Universal Information System of Carriers in the Republic of Bashkortostan;
 planning and financing of road activities in relation to motor roads of regional and inter-municipal significance;
 control over ensuring of sake-keeping and integrity of motor roads of regional and inter-municipal significance.

See also
United States Department of Housing and Urban Development

Notes and references

External links
 Republic of Bashkortostan State Committee of Transport and Roads Official site in Bashkir, English and Russian

Politics of Bashkortostan